Potiaxixa longipennis is a species of beetle in the family Cerambycidae. It was described by Zajciw in 1966. It is known from southeastern Brazil and French Guiana.

References

Cerambycini
Beetles described in 1966